Las mujeres mandan ("The Women Rule") is a 1937 Mexican film. It was directed by Fernando de Fuentes.

Plot

Del Diestro plays Isidoro a bored bank teller,  who decides to leave his family to follow a young dancer, Chayito, played by Tamayo.  Once in Mexico City they become lovers and she asks him to rob the bank he used to work for.

Cast

Alfredo del Diestro
Marina Tamayo
Sara Garcia
Joaquin Coss
Manuel Buendia
Carmen Conde

References

External links
 

1937 films
1930s Spanish-language films
Films directed by Fernando de Fuentes
Mexican black-and-white films
Mexican crime drama films
1937 crime drama films
1930s Mexican films